A total solar eclipse occurred on February 3, 1916. A solar eclipse occurs when the Moon passes between Earth and the Sun, thereby totally or partly obscuring the image of the Sun for a viewer on Earth. A total solar eclipse occurs when the Moon's apparent diameter is larger than the Sun's, blocking all direct sunlight, turning day into darkness. Totality occurs in a narrow path across Earth's surface, with the partial solar eclipse visible over a surrounding region thousands of kilometres wide.
Totality was visible in Colombia, Venezuela, and the whole Guadeloupe except Marie-Galante, Saint Martin and Saint Barthélemy.

Related eclipses

Solar eclipse 1913–1917

Saros 139

Tritos series

Notes

References
 Eclipse data, NASA
 Optical Response of the Atmosphere During the Caribbean Total Solar Eclipses of 26 February 1998 and of 3 February 1916 at Falcón state, Venezuela, Journal Earth, Moon, and Planets, Volume 91, Number 3 / November, 2002

1916 02 03
1916 in science
1916 02 03
February 1916 events